The New York Area Theological Library Association (NYATLA) was formed in 1977 and consists of universities and seminary libraries within the metropolitan New York area. It is a regional chapter of ATLA.

Faculty, librarians and students in theology or religious studies from NYATLA institutions are welcome to use each other's libraries. The association meets several times a year and operates under a constitution and bylaws.

References 

Libraries in New York (state)